Mariano's is a Midwestern grocery store chain that opened its doors in 2010. Mariano's is owned by Kroger. 44 Mariano's locations exist.

First location 
The first Mariano's opened in 2010 in Arlington Heights, Illinois. The location consists of 60,000 square feet of retail space.

Departments 

Departments in the store sell a range of food and drink including coffee and gelato, sushi, rotisserie chickens, smoked ribs, briskets, and sliders, salad bar buffet, oyster and liquor bar, cheese, sweets, juice and smoothies.

References

External links 

 

2010 establishments in Illinois
Supermarkets of the United States
Kroger